Louis Kaplan may refer to:

 Kid Kaplan (Louis Kaplan, 1901–1970), Ukrainian boxer
 Louis L. Kaplan (1902–2001), educator in Baltimore, Maryland

See also 
 Lewis Kaplan (disambiguation)